Cold Springs, California may refer to:
Cold Springs, El Dorado County, California
Cold Springs, Tuolumne County, California

es:Cold Springs (California)